Steleoneura is a genus of tachinid flies in the family Tachinidae.

Species
Steleoneura czernyi Stein, 1924
Steleoneura minuta Yang & Chao, 1990
Steleoneura novemmaculata Wood, 1985

References

Diptera of Europe
Diptera of Asia
Diptera of North America
Exoristinae
Tachinidae genera
Taxa named by Paul Stein